Radmila Savićević (8 February 1926 - 8 November 2001) was a Serbian actress. She appeared in more than sixty films from 1961 to 2000.

Selected filmography

References

External links 

1926 births
2001 deaths
Actors from Kruševac
Serbian film actresses